Hexadic is a studio album by rock band Six Organs of Admittance. It was released in February 2015 under Drag City Records.

Track list

References

2015 albums
Six Organs of Admittance albums
Drag City (record label) albums